Richard Alexander Kell (1 November 1927 – 2023) was an Irish poet, composer and teacher.

Biography
Kell was born in Youghal, County Cork, Ireland, on 1 November 1927, as the second of a Methodist missionary's four children. After early years in India he was educated mainly in Belfast and Dublin, where he graduated from Trinity College. He taught in England, finally as a senior lecturer in English and American literature. He contributed critical essays and poetry reviews to various periodicals (including The Guardian), and after retirement co-edited Other Poetry.

Kell began writing poetry at the age of ten, and at eighteen achieved newspaper publication with his now widely known poem 'Pigeons'. Since then his work has appeared in magazines, anthologies, and sixteen solo collections large and small (see bibliography).

Until 1995 Kell also wrote a small amount of music. He had public performances by vocal and instrumental soloists and ensembles, and (including a few broadcasts) by six orchestras, among them the BBC Concert Orchestra, Northern Sinfonia, and – while he was temporarily using the pseudonym Alec Richard – the Liverpool Philharmonic. His 17-minute Symphonic Elegy was composed in 1976 to commemorate the death of his wife Muriel the year before. His Variations on a notorious theme was broadcast in 1979.

Kell died in 2023, at the age of 95.

Bibliography
 Fantasy Poets 35 (Eynsham, Oxfordshire: Fantasy Press, 1957)
 Control Tower (London: Chatto & Windus, 1962)
 Differences (London: Chatto & Windus, 1969)
 Humours (Sutherland: Ceolfrith Press, 1978)
 Heartwood (Newcastle upon Tyne: Northern House, 1978)
 The Broken Circle (Sunderland: Ceolfrith Press, 1981)
 In Praise of Warmth, new and selected poems (Dublin: Dedalus Press, 1987)
 Rock and Water (Dublin: Dedalus Press, 1993)
 Collected Poems (Belfast: Lagan Press, 2001)
 Under the Rainbow (Belfast: Lagan Press, 2003)
 Letters to Enid (Beeston: Shoestring Press, 2004)
 Taking a Break (Shoestring Press, 2008)
 Hilarity and Wonder (Shoestring Press, 2011)
 Old Man Answering (Shoestring Press, 2014)
 Making Word Gifts (Shoestring Press, 2016)
The Whispering Sky (Shoestring Press, 2020)

References

 
 
 

1927 births
2023 deaths
Irish emigrants to the United Kingdom
Irish expatriates in India
Irish poets
People from County Cork